is a passenger railway station located in the city of Kōchi, Kōchi Prefecture, Japan. It is operated by JR Shikoku and has the station number "D41".

Lines

Although  is the official western terminus of the third-sector Tosa Kuroshio Railway Asa Line (also known as the Gomen-Nahari Line, all its rapid and some local trains continue towards  on the Dosan Line tracks with Tosa-Ōtsu as one of their intermediate stops.

Layout
Tosa-Ōtsu Station, which is unstaffed, consists of two opposed side platforms serving two tracks. A small building linked to one of the platforms serves as a waiting room. An overhead footbridge connects to the other platform. Weather shelters are provided on both platforms.

Adjacent stations

History
The station opened on 5 December 1925 as an intermediate stop when the then Kōchi Line (now Dosan Line) was extended from Kōchi eastwards and then northwards towards . At that time the station was operated by Japanese National Railways (JNR). With the privatization of JNR on 1 April 1987, control of the station passed to JR Shikoku.

Surrounding area
Kochi Prefectural Okatoyo High School
 Seiwa Girls' Junior and Senior High School
Okō Castle ruins

See also
 List of Railway Stations in Japan

References

External links

 JR Shikoku timetable

Railway stations in Kōchi Prefecture
Railway stations in Japan opened in 1925
Kōchi